The 2021 Murray State Racers football team represented Murray State University during the 2021 NCAA Division I FCS football season as a member of the Ohio Valley Conference (OVC). They were led by second-year head coach Dean Hood and played their games at Roy Stewart Stadium in Murray, Kentucky.

Schedule

Source:

References

Murray State
Murray State Racers football seasons
Murray State Racers football